Gayton Thorpe is a village and former civil parish, now in the parish of Gayton, in the King's Lynn and West Norfolk district, in the county of Norfolk, England. In 1931 the parish had a population of 136.

History
Gayton Thorpe's name is of Viking origin and derives from the Old Norse for Gayton's outlying farmstead or settlement.

Gayton Thorpe was recorded in the Domesday Book as T(h)orp. In the Domesday Book, Gayton Thorpe is listed as a settlement of 43 households in the hundred of Freebridge. In 1086, the village was divided between the estates of Bishop Odo of Bayeux, Roger Bigod, Henry de Ferrers and Ralph de Tosny.

On 1 April 1935 the parish was abolished and merged with Gayton.

Geography
Gayton Thorpe falls within the constituency of North West Norfolk and is represented at Parliament by James Wild MP of the Conservative Party.

St. Mary's Church
Gayton Thorpe's parish church is dedicated to Saint Mary and is one of Norfolk's 124 existing round-tower churches. St. Mary's also features a Medieval font depicting the seven sacraments and is Grade I listed.

Notes

External links

Villages in Norfolk
Former civil parishes in Norfolk
King's Lynn and West Norfolk